Fuzhou railway station  (also spelled Fúzhōu Huǒchē Zhàn or Fuzhou Huochezhan) is a metro station and a railway station located in Fuzhou, Fujian Province, China, at the junction of the Wenzhou–Fuzhou railway, Nanping–Fuzhou railway, and Fuzhou–Xiamen railway which are operated by the Nanchang Railway Bureau of the China Railway Corporation.

History
The station was opened in 1958 and expanded in 2004. From May 2016 it is served by the Line 1 of Fuzhou Metro.

Service

China Railway
Fuzhou railway station is a railway station in Jin'an District, Fuzhou, Fujian, China.

Fuzhou Metro

Fuzhou Railway Station is a station of Line 1 of the Fuzhou Metro. It is located underground of CR railway station. This station started operation on 6 January 2017.

See also
Fuzhou South railway station

References

External links

 Fuzhou Railway Station

Railway stations in Fujian
Railway stations in China opened in 1958
Buildings and structures in Fuzhou
Transport in Fuzhou
1958 establishments in China
Fuzhou Metro stations